Nobody's Business is a 1926 film directed by Norman Taurog with Lloyd Hamilton, Dick Sutherland, James T. Kelley.

References

External links

1926 films
Films directed by Norman Taurog
American silent short films
1926 comedy films
1926 short films
American black-and-white films
Silent American comedy films
American comedy short films
1920s American films